The 1978 Oklahoma State Cowboys football team represented Oklahoma State University as a member of the Big Eight Conference during the 1978 NCAA Division I-A football season. Led by Big Eight Conference in his sixth and final season as head coach, the Cowboys compiled an overall record of 3–8 with a mark of 3–4 in conference play, tying for fifth place in the Big 8. Oklahoma State played home games at Lewis Field in Stillwater, Oklahoma

Schedule

After the season

The 1979 NFL Draft was held on May 3–4, 1979. The following Cowboys were selected.

References

Oklahoma State
Oklahoma State Cowboys football seasons
Oklahoma State Cowboys football